DCU may refer to:

 D.C. United, an American professional soccer team based in Washington, D.C., United States
 DC Universe, the fictional universe that serves as a setting for DC Comics stories
 DC Universe (franchise), a media franchise
 Dublin City University
 DCU GAA, a Gaelic games club in Dublin City University
 Digital Federal Credit Union, a credit union based in Marlborough, Massachusetts, United States
 DCU Center, an indoor arena in Worcester, Massachusetts, United States
 Delphi Compiled Unit, an object file for the Delphi programming language
 Desert Camouflage Uniform, a U.S. military uniform that was used in arid areas during the 1990s and 2000s
Detached Carrier Unit of the United States Postal Service.
 Pryor Field Regional Airport, an airport Decatur, Alabama, United States, with the IATA code DCU
 Dicyclohexylurea, an organic compound.